Antony James Dillon Nash MBE (18 March 1936 – 17 March 2022) was a British bobsledder, born in Amersham, who competed in the 1960s. Competing in two Winter Olympics, he won the gold in the two-man event at the 1964 Winter Olympics in Innsbruck.

Nash also won three medals in the two-man event at the FIBT World Championships with one gold (1965) and two bronzes (1963, 1966).

Nash and his brakeman, Robin Dixon, were inducted into the British Bobsleigh Hall of Fame as a result of their success. A curve at the St. Moritz-Celerina Olympic Bobrun is named for both Nash and Dixon.

He was appointed Member of the Order of the British Empire (MBE) in the 1969 New Year Honours for services to Winter Sports.

Nash died on 17 March 2022, at the age of 85.

References

 Bobsleigh two-man Olympic medalists 1932-56 and since 1964
 Bobsleigh two-man world championship medalists since 1931
 British Bobsleigh Hall of Fame featuring Nash
 DatabaseOlympics.com profile
 Wallenchinsky, David. (1984). "Bobsled: Two-man". In The Complete Book of the Olympics: 1896-1980. New York: Penguin Books. p. 559.

1936 births
2022 deaths
People from Amersham
Bobsledders at the 1964 Winter Olympics
Bobsledders at the 1968 Winter Olympics
Olympic bobsledders of Great Britain
English Olympic medallists
Olympic gold medallists for Great Britain
British male bobsledders
Olympic medalists in bobsleigh
Medalists at the 1964 Winter Olympics
Members of the Order of the British Empire